Flying disc sports are sports or games played with discs, often called by the trademarked name Frisbees. Ultimate and disc golf are sports with substantial international followings.

History

The flying disc was developed in 1948 by Walter Morrison. On January 23, 1957, Wham-O bought the rights to the invention and released it later under the trademarked name Frisbee.

Although playing catch with discs as a pastime and proto-golf games are documented from the early 1900s, and doubtlessly occurred from time to time before, disc sports began to flower in the late 1960s. As numbers of young people became alienated from social norms, they looked for alternative recreational activities, including that of throwing a frisbee. What started with a few players in the sixties, like Victor Malafronte, Z Weyand and Ken Westerfield experimenting with new ways of throwing and catching a disc, later would become known as playing disc freestyle. Organized disc sports began in the 1970s with promotional efforts from Wham-O and Irwin Toy (Canada). These took the form of national tournaments and Frisbee show tours at universities, fairs and sporting events. Disc sports such as freestyle, double disc court, guts, ultimate and disc golf became this sport's first events. Two sports, the team sport of ultimate and disc golf, are very popular worldwide and are now being played semi-professionally. The World Flying Disc Federation, Professional Disc Golf Association and the Freestyle Players Association are the official sanctioning organizations for disc sports worldwide.

Guts was invented by the Healy Brothers in the 1950s and developed at the International Frisbee Tournament (IFT) in Marquette, Michigan. Ultimate, the most widely played disc sport, began in the late 1960s with Joel Silver and Jared Kass. In the 1970s it developed as an organized sport with the creation of the Ultimate Players Association with Dan Roddick, Tom Kennedy and Irv Kalb. Double disc court was invented and introduced in the early 1970s by Jim Palmeri. In 1974, freestyle competition was created and introduced by Ken Westerfield and Discraft's Jim Kenner. Judging standards were developed by the Freestyle Players Association. In 1976, the game of disc golf was standardized with targets called "pole holes" invented and developed by Wham-O's Ed Headrick and the Professional Disc Golf Association.

Beginning in 1974, the International Frisbee Association (IFA), under the direction of Dan Roddick, became the regulatory organization for all of these sports.

Ultimate

Ultimate (also called Ultimate Frisbee) is a competitive non-contact team sport. The object of the game is to score points by passing the disc to a team member in the opposing team's end zone. Players may not move about the field while holding the disc. Catching is done with one hand or both hands on the rim or with hands simultaneously on the top and bottom, sometimes referred to as a clap-catch. When one-hand catching on the rim, care must always be taken in hand placement and making sure to  catch on the correct side of the disc, according to which way the disc is spinning. One side will tend to spin out of your hand, while the other side will spin into your hand, making for a more secure catch. Many players avoid this problem by catching with both hands when possible. The most popular throws used in a game of ultimate are backhand, sidearm/forehand, hammer and scoober. Being a deep threat, with multiple throwing techniques and the ability to pass the disc before the defense has had a chance to reset, is always optimal. Some players use a throw and catch freestyle practice to help improve their ultimate handling skills. The game was invented in 1968 as an evening pastime by Jared Kass. Ultimate is distinguished by its Spirit of the Game - the principles of fair play, sportsmanship, and the joy of play. USA Ultimate (USAU) and Ultimate Canada are the rules and sanctioning organizations for ultimate in the US and Canada. While USAU and WFDF rulesets differ, the organizations have been working together over the past 3 years to bring the rulesets into closer alignment. The American Ultimate Disc League (AUDL) and Major League Ultimate (MLU) are the first men's semi-professional ultimate leagues. The Major League Ultimate (MLU) ceased operation on December 21, 2016. In 2019 the Premier Ultimate League, ultimate's first Women's semi-pro league launched followed by the Western Ultimate league in 2020. Currently the highest level of International Ultimate is the World Games followed by the World Ultimate and Guts Championship.

Games based on Ultimate

A number of games have evolved which are derived or similar to Ultimate, but played with different rules. These games are often played when available fields or teams are too small for a full sized ultimate game.

Many other rules variants for ultimate are played on a regular basis, either to accommodate the number of available players, speed up certain elements of the game, or to help a team practice specific aspects of their strategy.

Disc golf

Disc golf is a game based on the rules of golf (referred to by disc golfers as "ball and stick golf"). It uses discs smaller and denser than an ultimate disc. The discs are thrown towards a target, which serves as the "hole". The official targets are metal baskets with hanging chains to catch the discs. In 2016, the PDGA severed ties with WFDF leaving it unclear who is the primary driver for global growth of the game.

Urban disc golf
Before there were standardized targets called pole holes, disc golf used to be played in parks and urban settings using natural objects as targets. In some cases courses were created by the players themselves as they played, with each player taking turns determining targets and throwing designations (mandatories and out of bounds)

Freestyle play and competition

Disc freestyle, also known as freestyle Frisbee in reference to the trademarked brand name, is a sport and performing art characterized by creative, acrobatic, and athletic maneuvers with a flying disc. Freestyle is performed individually or more commonly in groups, both competitively and recreationally. In the early 1970s before the invention of the "nail-delay", freestyle catching possibilities would depend on the throw you were given; it was always spontaneous and unpredictable. Play with this type of freestyle was performed with two players standing 30-40 yards apart. The throws were fast and varied, and the catches were right off the throw, except for the occasional kick or slap-up and rarely a pause between the catch and the throw back. At advanced levels, the throws and catches would become a flow that was created once you mastered the basics. It was fast and fluid and visibly would resemble martial arts and dance.  Most competitive freestyle today centers around the nail-delay with many players using what are called delay-aids (plastic nails and silicone sprays).

Many players of other disc sports will often use a throw and catch (no plastic nails or sprays) version of freestyle, to warm up for their disc games. Ultimate disc players often use freestyle to improve their throwing and catching skills as well as a good way to add focus and flexibility to their game.

Freestyle competition is an event where teams of two or three players perform a routine which consists of a series of creative throwing and catching techniques set to music. The routine is judged on the basis of difficulty, execution and presentation. The team with the best total score is declared the winner.

In 1974, Ken Westerfield and Jim Kenner (founder and CEO of Discraft), introduced and won the first flying disc freestyle competition at the 3rd annual Canadian Open Frisbee Championships, Toronto, Ontario, Canada and the Vancouver Open Frisbee Championships. These were the first Frisbee freestyle competitions.

A year later the American Flying Disc Open (AFDO) Rochester, New York, the Octad in New Brunswick, New Jersey and the 1975 World Frisbee Championships, held at the Rose Bowl in Pasadena, California, adopted Westerfield and Kenners freestyle competition format as one of their events. Today this same freestyle event is now accepted as one of the premier events in Flying disc tournaments worldwide.

The Freestyle Players Association was formed to oversee the competitive aspects of freestyle frisbee, and to help new players learn how to freestyle.

Guts

Guts or Guts Frisbee is a disc sport inspired by dodgeball, involving teams throwing a flying disc (rather than balls) at members of the opposing team. One to five team members stand in a line facing the opposing team across the court, with the two teams lined up parallel to each other. Which team begins play is determined "flipping the disc", an action similar to a coin toss, but using the disc itself. One member of the team is then selected to start play.
That member then raises an arm to indicate readiness to throw, at which point the members of the opposing team freeze in position. If the thrower misses the "scoring area" (a demarcated area a bit larger than the space occupied by the opposing team), the receiving team scores a point. If a member of the receiving team catches the disc cleanly, neither team scores a point. If the throw is within the scoring area and the receiving team fails to catch, or catches but drops the disc, the throwing team gets a point. The receiving team then picks up the disc and becomes the throwing team. The receiving team must catch the disc cleanly in one hand, and may not move from position until after the disc leaves the hand of the thrower. The disc may not be trapped between the hand and any other part of the body, including the other hand. This frequently results in a challenging sequence of "tips" or "bobbles", which are rebounds of the disc off of receivers' hands or body to slow the disc down and keep it in play until it can be caught. This often involves multiple players on the receiving team.
Play continues until at least 21 points have been scored by one of the teams and there is a difference in score of at least 2 points.

Double Disc Court

Double disc court (DDC) invented and introduced by Frisbee Hall of Fame inductee Jim Palmeri of Rochester, NY, is a sport played with two flying discs. Two teams of two players each stand in their own courts. The goal is to defend a court from an attack by the opposing team. Two identical square courts are located on a level playing field of grass measuring 13 meters on a side. The distance between the courts is 17 meters. Attacks are made in two ways: by throwing a disc in play into the opponents' court in an attempt to have the disc come to rest within that court without ever having touched out-of-bounds, or by causing both discs to be touched by a player or players on the opposing team at the same time (called a "double"). A team scores a point whenever they make a successful attack or whenever an opponent throws a disc out-of-bounds. The first team to score the requisite number of points as determined by the competitive format wins the game.

Canine Disc

Canine Disc (or dog disc) is a dog sport and a disc sport. In canine disc competitions, dogs and their human flying disc throwers compete in events such as distance catching and somewhat choreographed freestyle catching. The sport celebrates the bond between handler and dog, by allowing them to work together.

Disc games adapted from non-disc games

These games originated when the rules of another game were adjusted to use a flying disc in place of a ball.

Other/unclassified games
 Flutterguts — a game used mainly to practice catching flying discs
 Kan-jam - a variation of horseshoes.
 Polish horseshoes - similar to Fricket, but with one pole on each end, with a bottle upright on top of each one (also known as Beersbee)

See also
 Disc golf
 Ultimate Canada
 Ultimate (sport)
 Disc dog
 Guts (flying disc game)
 Flying disc freestyle
 Ken Westerfield

External links
 Official Rules for Double Disc Court 
 How To Play Double Disc Court (DDC) Instructional Video

References

 
Flying disc
Throwing games
Sports originating in Australia
Sports originating in the United States
Sports originating in Canada
Disc golf